Newton Township is one of thirteen townships in Jasper County, Indiana, United States. As of the 2010 census, its population was 811 and it contained 316 housing units.

Geography

Unincorporated towns
 Surrey

Adjacent townships
 Union Township (north)
 Marion Township (east)
 Jordan Township (south)
 Iroquois Township, Newton County (southwest)
 Jackson Township, Newton County (west)
 Colfax Township, Newton County (northwest)

Cemeteries
The township contains three cemeteries: Burr Oak, Memory Gardens, bluegrass and Old Settlers.

Major highways
  Interstate 65
  Indiana State Road 14
  Indiana State Road 114

Education
Newton Township residents are eligible to obtain a free library card from the Jasper County Public Library.

References
Citations

Sources
 U.S. Board on Geographic Names (GNIS)
 United States Census Bureau cartographic boundary files

External links
 Indiana Township Association
 United Township Association of Indiana

Townships in Jasper County, Indiana
Townships in Indiana